James Franklin Hickman, II (May 9, 1943 – August 1, 1982) was an American race car driver known as Jim Hickman.

Racing career
Hickman was a driver in the 1982 CART Indycar series and raced in 3 CART contests that year as well as the Indianapolis 500, which, that year, was not a CART event.  He finished 3 of his 4 races in the top ten and was named Indy 500 Rookie of the Year, where he finished 7th.

Death
Hickman died in an accident during a practice session at the second Milwaukee Mile race of the 1982 season, the Tony Bettenhausen 200 at Wisconsin State Fair Park.  Published reports indicated that CART observers and technical personnel determined that a stuck throttle  was the cause of the accident.  Driving a 1981 March 81C-Cosworth for Hoffman racing sponsored by Stroh's Beer, his car slammed into the concrete wall in the first turn of the one-mile (1.6 km) oval. It took safety officials about 15 minutes to pry the 39-year-old former Navy fighter pilot out of the wreckage. He was pronounced dead about 12 hours later in a Milwaukee hospital. Dr. Steve Olvey, medical director for CART, said Hickman died of head injuries.  The accident occurred with less than five minutes remaining in the final practice session.

Personal life
Hickman was born to Ioma Hickman (1922–2006) and James Franklin (1923–1966), in Panama, Oklahoma. He had two younger brothers, Hercel Harvey Hickman and Terry Lynn Hickman (deceased). He was a 1966 graduate of Oklahoma State University in Stillwater, OK.

Family
He was survived by his wife, Lynda, and two children, Ashley and James Franklin III.

Racing record

SCCA National Championship Runoffs

References

External links

1943 births
1982 deaths
People from Le Flore County, Oklahoma
Indianapolis 500 drivers
Indianapolis 500 Rookies of the Year
Racing drivers who died while racing
Sports deaths in Wisconsin
Racing drivers from Oklahoma
Place of birth missing
SCCA National Championship Runoffs winners